Ferenc Tégla (born 15 July 1947 in Szegvár) is a Hungarian former discus thrower who competed in the 1968 Summer Olympics, in the 1972 Summer Olympics, and in the 1976 Summer Olympics.

References

1947 births
Living people
Hungarian male discus throwers
Olympic athletes of Hungary
Athletes (track and field) at the 1968 Summer Olympics
Athletes (track and field) at the 1972 Summer Olympics
Athletes (track and field) at the 1976 Summer Olympics
Universiade medalists in athletics (track and field)
Sportspeople from Csongrád-Csanád County
Universiade bronze medalists for Hungary
Medalists at the 1973 Summer Universiade
Medalists at the 1975 Summer Universiade